Derbyshire County Cricket Club in 1983 was the cricket season when the English club Derbyshire had been playing for one hundred and twelve years. In the County Championship, they won seven matches to finish ninth in their seventy ninth season in the Championship. They came sixth in the John Player Special League. They did not progress from the group in the Benson & Hedges Cup and reached round two in the National Westminster Bank Trophy.

1983 season

Derbyshire played twenty four first class matches, which were all in the County Championship.  They won seven matches and lost five in both the championship and in the Sunday league. They lost to Middlesex in the second round of the NWB Trophy and lost the only two matches which were completed in the Benson and Hedges Cup.
  
Barry Wood was captain, Kim Barnett was top scorer and Ole Mortensen took most wickets.

Bill Fowler made his first class debut for the club in the first of two seasons.

Matches

First Class
{| class="wikitable" width="100%"
! bgcolor="#efefef" colspan=6 | List of matches
|- bgcolor="#efefef"
!No.
!Date
!V
!Result 
!Margin
!Notes
|- 
|1 
|  30 Apr 1983   
|  Gloucestershire  County Ground, Derby  
|bgcolor="#FFCC00"|Drawn
| 
|    Stovold 181 
|- 
|2
 |4 May 1983
| Leicestershire Grace Road, Leicester 
|bgcolor="#FFCC00"|Drawn
| 
|     
|- 
|3
 |11 May 1983
 | Lancashire  Queen's Park, Chesterfield  
|bgcolor="#FFCC00"|Drawn
| 
|     
|- 
|4
 |28 May 1983
| Nottinghamshire  Trent Bridge, Nottingham 
|bgcolor="#00FF00"|Won
| 6 wickets
|    Single innings match 
|- 
|5
| 4 Jun 1983
| Hampshire County Ground, Derby
|bgcolor="#FFCC00"|Drawn
| 
|    C Smith 193; Jesty 187 Southern 5–60 
|- 
|6
 |8 Jun 1983
| Middlesex    Uxbridge Cricket Club Ground 
|bgcolor="#FF0000"|Lost
| 9 wickets
|    Butcher 179 
|- 
|7
 | 11 Jun 1983
| Leicestershire County Ground, Derby 
|bgcolor="#FF0000"|Lost
| Innings and 4 runs
|    Ferris 5–29 
|- 
|8
 |15 Jun 1983  
 | Essex   County Ground, Derby 
|bgcolor="#FF0000"|Lost
| Innings and 25 runs
|    McEwan 178 
|- 
|9
 |18 Jun 1983  
| SomersetRecreation Ground, Bath
|bgcolor="#00FF00"|Won
| 123 runs
|    OH Mortensen 5–43 
|- 
|10
 |22 Jun 1983 
| Yorkshire Abbeydale Park, Sheffield    
|bgcolor="#00FF00"|Won
| 22 runs
|    Boycott 112; Carrick 5–45 and 7–44; OH Mortensen 6–27 and 5–62; DG Moir 5–114
|- 
|11
 |25 Jun 1983  
| Middlesex    Queen's Park, Chesterfield 
|bgcolor="#FF0000"|Lost
| 9 wickets
|    Edmonds 6–38 
|- 
|12
| 2 Jul 1983
|  Worcestershire County Ground, Derby 
|bgcolor="#00FF00"|Won
| 8 wickets
|    A Hill 137; 
|- 
|13
 |9 Jul 1983   
|  Gloucestershire  Phoenix County Ground, Bristol 
|bgcolor="#FFCC00"|Drawn
| 
|    Childs 6–81 
|- 
|14
 |13 Jul 1983
| Warwickshire  Edgbaston, Birmingham 
|bgcolor="#00FF00"|Won
| 10 wickets
|    A Hill 121; Gifford 6–77; DG Moir 5–44; RJ Finney 5–58 
|- 
|15
 |16 Jul 1983
| Northamptonshire  County Ground, Derby 
|bgcolor="#FFCC00"|Drawn
| 
|    Larkins 236; KJ Barnett 103 
|- 
|16
| 27 Jul 1983
| Hampshire United Services Recreation Ground, Portsmouth
|bgcolor="#FF0000"|Lost
| 6 wickets
|    Nicholas 100; Tremlett 6–82 
|- 
|17
 |30 Jul 1983  
| Kent  Queen's Park, Chesterfield 
|bgcolor="#FFCC00"|Drawn
| 
|    Aslett 168 and 119; IS Anderson 112; KJ Barnett 106 
|- 
|18
 |6 Aug 1983  
|  Sussex   The Saffrons, Eastbourne  
|bgcolor="#FFCC00"|Drawn
| 
|    Pigott 6–22 
|- 
|19
 |13 Aug 1983  
| SomersetCounty Ground, Derby 
|bgcolor="#FFCC00"|Drawn
| 
|    G Miller 5–71 
|- 
|20
 |20 Aug 1983
 | Glamorgan   St Helen's, Swansea 
|bgcolor="#00FF00"|Won
| 2 wickets
|    Hopkins 109 
|- 
|21
 |24 Aug 1983
 | Lancashire  Stanley Park, Blackpool 
|bgcolor="#FFCC00"|Drawn
| 
|    Simmons 101*; A Hill 106; Hayes 127; G Miller 5–98 
|- 
|22
 |27 Aug 1983 
| Yorkshire Queen's Park, Chesterfield 
|bgcolor="#FFCC00"|Drawn
|
|    Boycott 169; Carrick 5–122; MA Holding 5–48 
|- 
|23
 |7 Sep 1983  
| Nottinghamshire  County Ground, Derby 
|bgcolor="#00FF00"|Won
| 100 runs
|    Cooper 5–32; MA Holding 5–53 
|- 
|24
 |10 Sep 1983 
|  Surrey Kennington Oval  
|bgcolor="#FFCC00"|Drawn
| 
|    KJ Barnett 121; A Hill 111; MA Holding 5–54 
|-

John Player Special League 
{| class="wikitable" width="70%"
! bgcolor="#efefef" colspan=6 | List of matches
|- bgcolor="#efefef"
!No.
!Date
!V
!Result 
!Margin
!Notes
  |- 
|1
|8 May 1983
 | Lancashire  Old Trafford, Manchester   
|Abandoned
| 
|     
|- 
|2
| 15 May 1983
| Northamptonshire  County Ground, Derby 
|bgcolor="#00FF00"|Won
| 78 runs
|     
|- 
|3
|22 May 1983  
| Essex   County Ground, Chelmsford  
|Abandoned
| 
|     
|- 
|4
|5 Jun 1983  
| Warwickshire Courtaulds Ground, Coventry 
|bgcolor="#00FF00"|Won
| 5 wickets
|    JG Wright 108 
|- 
|5
 | 12 Jun 1983
| Leicestershire County Ground, Derby 
|bgcolor="#FF0000"|Lost
| 5 wickets
|     
|- 
|6
 | 26 Jun 1983  
| Middlesex    Queen's Park, Chesterfield 
|bgcolor="#FF0000"|Lost
| 4 wickets
|     
|- 
|7
|3 Jul 1983
|  Worcestershire County Ground, Derby 
|bgcolor="#00FF00"|Won
| 4 wickets
|     
|- 
|8
 |10 Jul 1983   
|  Gloucestershire  Phoenix County Ground, Bristol 
|bgcolor="#00FF00"|Won
| 3 wickets
|     
|- 
|9
|24 Jul 1983  
| Nottinghamshire  County Ground, Derby 
|bgcolor="#00FF00"|Won
| 3 wickets
|     
|- 
|10
| 31 Jul 1983  
| Kent  Queen's Park, Chesterfield 
|bgcolor="#FFCC00"|No Result
|
|     
|- 
|11
 |7 Aug 1983  
|  Sussex   The Saffrons, Eastbourne  
|bgcolor="#FF0000"|Lost
| 2 runs
|     
|- 
|12
 |14 Aug 1983  
| SomersetTown Ground, Heanor 
|bgcolor="#00FF00"|Won
| 8 wickets
|    KJ Barnett 100 
|- 
|13
 |21 Aug 1983
 | Glamorgan   St Helen's, Swansea 
|bgcolor="#FF0000"|Lost
| 22 runs
|     
|- 
|14
 |28 Aug 1983 
| Yorkshire Park Avenue Cricket Ground, Bradford 
|bgcolor="#FF0000"|Lost
| 2 wickets
|     
|- 
|15
 |4 Sep 1983 
| Hampshire County Ground, Derby
|bgcolor="#00FF00"|Won
| 8 runs
|     
|- 
|16
|11 Sep 1983 
|  Surrey Kennington Oval  
|Abandoned
| 
|     
|-

National Westminster Bank Trophy 
{| class="wikitable" width="70%"
! bgcolor="#efefef" colspan=6 | List of matches
|- bgcolor="#efefef"
!No.
!Date
!V
!Result 
!Margin
!Notes
 |- 
|1st Round
|29 Jun 1983  
| Suffolk   Victory Ground, Bury St Edmunds 
|bgcolor="#00FF00"|Won
| 6 wickets
|     
|- 
|2nd Round
|20 Jul 1983  
| Middlesex    County Ground, Derby  
|bgcolor="#FF0000"|Lost
| 30 runs
|     
|-

Benson and Hedges Cup
 {| class="wikitable" width="70%"
! bgcolor="#efefef" colspan=6 | List of matches
|- bgcolor="#efefef"
!No.
!Date
!V
!Result 
!Margin
!Notes
|-
| Group A 1
 |7 May 1983 
| Yorkshire Queen's Park, Chesterfield  
|Abandoned
| 
|     
|- 
| Group A 2
 |14 May 1983  
| Warwickshire  Edgbaston, Birmingham  
|bgcolor="#FF0000"|Lost
| 61 runs
|    Kallicharran 119; Willis 5–37 
|- 
| Group A 3
 |17 May 1983
| Nottinghamshire  Trent Bridge, Nottingham  
|bgcolor="#FF0000"|Lost
|  51 runs
|     
|- 
| Group A 4
 |19 May 1983
 | Lancashire  County Ground, Derby 
|bgcolor="#FFCC00"|No Result
|  
|     
|-

Statistics

Competition batting averages

Competition bowling averages

Wicket Keeping
Bob Taylor
County Championship Catches 37, Stumping 2
John Player League Catches 4, Stumping 1
NWB Trophy Catches 4, Stumping 0
B & H Trophy Catches 4, Stumping 0
Bernie Maher
County Championship Catches 13, Stumping 3
John Player League Catches 5, Stumping 1

See also
Derbyshire County Cricket Club seasons
1983 English cricket season

References

1983 in English cricket
Derbyshire County Cricket Club seasons